Valentina Bettarini (born 29 June 1990) is an Italian ice hockey player and member of the Italian national ice hockey team, currently playing with the EVB Eagles Südtirol in both the European Women's Hockey League (EWHL) and the Italian Hockey League Women (IHLW). She represented Italy in the women's ice hockey tournament at the 2006 Winter Olympics in Torino. Aged 15 years and 228 days, she was the youngest woman to participate in the tournament.

Bettarini has been an EWHL champion five times, winning in 2011, 2012, 2015, and 2016 with the EHV Sabres and in 2017 with the EVB Eagles. With the EVB Eagles, she is also a four-time winner of the Italian Championship, in 2017, 2018, 2021, and 2022.

Career stats

International

Olympic qualification scoring not included in career totals

References

External links 
 
 

1990 births
Living people
European Women's Hockey League players
Ice hockey people from Bolzano
Ice hockey players at the 2006 Winter Olympics
Italian expatriate ice hockey people
Italian expatriate sportspeople in Austria
Italian expatriate sportspeople in Germany
Italian ice hockey defencemen
Italian women's ice hockey players
Olympic ice hockey players of Italy